The Clue in the Embers is Volume 35 in the original The Hardy Boys Mystery Stories published by Grosset & Dunlap.

This book was written for the Stratemeyer Syndicate by John Almquist in 1955. Between 1959 and 1973 the first 38 volumes of this series were systematically revised as part of a project directed by Harriet Adams, Edward Stratemeyer's daughter. The original version of this book was shortened in 1972 by Priscilla Baker-Carr resulting in two slightly different stories sharing the same title.

Plot summary

In solving the mystery of two medallions missing from an inherited curio collection, the Hardys wind up in a desolate area of Guatemala at the mercy of a dangerous gang of thugs plotting to steal a national treasure.
The area is supposedly cursed, as some locals warn the Hardys not to visit the area. However, other men are looking for the treasure as well.

References

The Hardy Boys books
1955 American novels
1955 children's books
1972 American novels
1972 children's books
Grosset & Dunlap books
Novels set in Guatemala